Carlos Palacios may refer to:
 Carlos Palacios (Honduran footballer) (born 1982)
 Carlos Palacios (Chilean footballer) (born 2000)